Muskeg Tower Airport  is an airport located near Muskeg Tower, Alberta, Canada.

References

Registered aerodromes in Alberta
Transport in the Regional Municipality of Wood Buffalo